Gottfried Ungerboeck (born 15 March 1940, Vienna) is an Austrian communications engineer.

Ungerboeck received an electrical engineering degree (with emphasis on telecommunications) from Vienna University of Technology in 1964, and a Ph.D. from the Swiss Federal Institute of Technology, Zurich, in 1970. He joined IBM Austria as a systems engineer in 1965, and the IBM Zurich Research Laboratory in 1967.

At Zurich he worked on digital signal processing and switching systems, communication and information theory. Among many contributions to the theory of data transmission, he invented trellis coded modulation.

Ungerboeck joined Broadcom in 1998 as Technical Director for Communication business line.

He has won the 2018 Shannon Award of the IEEE Information Theory Society.

Awards and honours
IBM Fellow (1984) 
IEEE Fellow (1985) 
Broadcom Fellow and Distinguished Engineer (2006)
IEEE Richard W. Hamming Medal (1994)
Marconi Prize (1996) 
Australia Prize (1997)
 Golden Jubilee Award for Technological Innovation from the IEEE Information Theory Society (1998), for "the invention of trellis coded modulation".
 Claude E. Shannon Award (2018)

References

External links
1997 Australia Prize
Ungerboeck Wins "Nobel Prize of Communications"
Gottfried Ungerboeck Oral History, IEEE Global History Network

IBM Fellows
Fellow Members of the IEEE
Austrian information theorists
Coding theorists
Living people
ETH Zurich alumni
TU Wien alumni
1940 births
Australia Prize recipients
Austrian expatriates in Switzerland